State Route 323 (SR 323) is an east–west state highway in southwestern Ohio.  SR 323's western terminus is at SR 41 in South Solon.  Its eastern terminus is at SR 56 just northwest of Mount Sterling.

Route description

SR 323 runs exclusively within the southern portion of Madison County.  No portion of SR 323 is included within the National Highway System.

Major intersections

References

External links

323
Transportation in Madison County, Ohio